Bird Island Nature Reserve is a  CapeNature nature reserve in Lambert's Bay, South Africa. It is an important breeding site for Cape gannets and crowned cormorants.

History
Bird guano was collected on the island for fertiliser from 1888 until 1990. The island is now a tourist attraction.

References

External links
 Official website

Protected areas of the Western Cape
Nature reserves in South Africa